Juai may refer to:

 Lower Yangtze Mandarin (ISO 639 language code juai)
 Juai, a fictional character from Detatoko Princess portrayed by Shiho Niiyama
 Juai, Tanjung, Tabalong, South Kalimantan, Kalimantan, Indonesia; a village on Borneo
 Juai, Balangan Regency, South Kalimantan, Kalimantan, Indonesia; a district on Borneo

See also

 jūái; see List of loanwords in Malay
 /ˌjuːˈaɪ/ (GUI); see graphical user interface
 Juglans ailantifolia (JUAI2), the Japanese walnut